Ivan Maksymovich Vladychenko (16 January 1924 – 19 August 2022) was a Soviet and Ukrainian trade unionist and politician. He served on the Central Committee of the Communist Party of the Soviet Union from 1966 to 1990.

Vladychenko died on 19 August 2022, at the age of 98.

References

1924 births
2022 deaths
Soviet politicians
Central Committee of the Communist Party of the Soviet Union
Central Committee of the Communist Party of the Soviet Union candidate members
Donetsk National Technical University alumni
People from Donetsk Oblast
Recipients of the Order of the Red Banner of Labour